Clarence Walter "Buddy" Hicks (February 15, 1927 – December 8, 2014) was an American professional baseball player and manager. Primarily a shortstop during his 17-year active career (1944; 1947–62), he also played third base and first base.

Hicks had a 26-game trial with the  Detroit Tigers of Major League Baseball, garnering ten hits in 47 at bats for a .213 batting average, with two doubles and five runs batted in. Defensively, he handled 52 total chances at shortstop and second base without an error for a 1.000 fielding percentage. The rest of his career was spent in minor league baseball, with the Brooklyn Dodgers, Tigers, Boston Braves/Milwaukee Braves and Philadelphia Phillies organizations. In 1,854 minor league games, he batted .273 with 63 home runs.

He spent a decade (1960–69) as a minor league manager, working for the Braves and Washington Senators, including all or parts of three seasons at the Double-A level.

References

External links

Venezuelan Professional Baseball League statistics

1927 births
2014 deaths
Atlanta Crackers players
Baltimore Orioles (IL) players
Baseball players from California
Buffalo Bisons (minor league) players
Charleston Senators players
Cervecería Caracas players
Detroit Tigers players
Hollywood Stars players
Licoreros de Pampero players
Major League Baseball infielders
Minor league baseball managers
Newport News Dodgers players
People from Belvedere, California
St. Paul Saints (AA) players
Spokane Indians players
Trenton Packers players
Yakima Braves players
American expatriate baseball players in Cuba
American expatriate baseball players in Venezuela